Serine/threonine-protein phosphatase 2A catalytic subunit alpha isoform is an enzyme that (in humans) is encoded by the PPP2CA gene.

Function 

This gene encodes the phosphatase 2A catalytic subunit. Protein phosphatase 2A is one of the four major Ser/Thr phosphatases, and it is implicated in the negative control of cell growth and division. It consists of a common heteromeric core enzyme, which is composed of a catalytic subunit and a constant regulatory subunit, that associates with a variety of regulatory subunits. This gene encodes an alpha isoform of the catalytic subunit.

Interactions 

PPP2CA has been shown to interact with:

 Bcl-2, 
 Bestrophin 1, 
 CCNG2, 
 CTTNBP2NL, 
 CTTNBP2, 
 Cyclin-dependent kinase 2, 
 Cyclin-dependent kinase 6, 
 FAM40A, 
 IGBP1, 
 MOBKL3, 
 PPP2R1A, 
 PPP2R1B, 
 PPP2R2A, 
 PPP2R3B, 
 PPP2R5A,
 PPP2R5B, 
 PPP2R5C, 
 PPP2R5D, 
 PPP2R5E, 
 STRN3, 
 STRN,  and
 TLX1.

See also 
PPP2CB

References

Further reading